Octon may refer to:

 Octons toy, sets of interlocking plastic octagons by Galt Toys
Octon, East Riding of Yorkshire, England
Octon, Hérault, France
Octon (eclipse cycle), a type of eclipse cycle in astronomy
Octon (Dungeons & Dragons), fictional creature in Dungeons and Dragons